World Fishing Network (WFN) is an American television network that offers online and mobile platform dedicated to fishing. The network's programming covers instruction, tips, tournaments, travel, food, boating, outdoor lifestyle, and more. WFN is available to cable, satellite, and telecommunication subscribers throughout the United States and the Caribbean. WFN's lineup also includes a selection of the best and most diverse species coverage of any programming on television.

History

The channel's roots began in Canada on December 2, 2005, when it was launched under the ownership of Insight Sports. The company expanded the channel in the United States in November 2007 with its launch on Verizon FiOS as a standard definition channel. A few months later, in May 2008, WFN launched a high definition (HD) channel on Dish Network, called "World Fishing Network HD", a channel with a separate schedule from its standard definition counterpart. The HD channel was added to Verizon FiOS that year. Since WFN's launch on Verizon and Dish Network, it has been added to several other television providers such as Charter Communications, and television providers in the Caribbean, including Flow Cable in Jamaica.

On January 10, 2011, WFN announced that it had sold a 50% stake in its U.S. operations to Altitude Sports and Entertainment. In 2011, Altitude Sports and Entertainment purchased a 19.9% interest in the Canadian channel through its division Altitude WFN ULC. Altitude would later purchase the remaining 50% interest in the channel.

On January 14, 2019, World Fishing Network in Canada officially relaunched as Sportsman Channel.

See also
 Sportsman Channel (Canadian TV channel)
 Extreme Angler TV

References

External links
 

Television channels and stations established in 2007
Kroenke Sports & Entertainment